Cyntia was a Japanese heavy metal band formed in 2011. They are believed to have been the first act from the Girls Metal Band Boom to have signed to a major record label when they joined Victor Entertainment in 2013. Drummer and co-founder Kanoko left the group in April 2015, and the band moved to the Village Again Association label for their 2016 album Urban Night. Cyntia began an indefinite hiatus after January 13, 2018.

History

Guitarist Yui and drummer Kanoko formed Cyntia in April 2011, after meeting on the set of a music video by Liv Moon. In the summer they recruited keyboardist Ayano and bassist Airi, who were followed by vocalist and former idol Saki in November after holding auditions. The name Cyntia is the English pronunciation of Cynthia, another name for the Greek goddess Artemis. Their debut single, "Run to the Future", was released in April 2012 on Bright Star Records, which was formed by fellow all-female metal band Aldious. Shortly after, Airi paused activities due to ill health and Azu from LAZYgunsBRISKY was chosen as support bassist. Airi officially left the group in June, but the band released their first album Endless World in September. Azu became a full member in November.

In January 2013, Cyntia was the backing band for South Korean pop group Kara's concert at the Tokyo Dome. The band released their major label debut, the album Lady Made, in March on Victor Entertainment. Cyntia was voted 2013's best new artist by readers of heavy metal magazine Burrn!. They performed at that year's Naon no Yaon female-only rock festival and then opened for American metal band Kamelot on their Japanese tour.

Their song "Senko Strings" was used as the fourth ending theme song to Saint Seiya Omega and released as a single in January 2014. Similarly, "Kiss Kiss Kiss" was used as the theme song of the 2014 Itazura na Kiss 2 ~Love in Okinawa television drama special, before being released as a single in January 2015. Its follow up a month later, "Akatsuki no Hana", was used as the second opening theme of the Yona of the Dawn anime adaptation. The album Woman was also released in February and featured a soft pop rock sound.

Drummer and co-founder Kanoko left the group in April 2015. Cyntia released their album Urban Night on December 14, 2016, via the VAA (Village Again Association) record label. The song "Bless of the Fire" features Aldious guitarist Toki. On December 26, 2017, Cyntia announced that they were suspending all activities indefinitely due to Yui's focal dystonia. Although the guitarist was planning to leave the band so someone new could take her place, the other members decided not to continue without her. An event on January 13, 2018, was their last.

Members
Yui – guitar, backing vocals (2011–2018)
Ayano – keyboards, piano, backing vocals (2011–2018)
Saki – vocals (2011–2018)
Azu – bass, piano, backing vocals (2012–2018)

Former members
Airi – bass (2011–2012)
Kanoko – drums, percussion, backing vocals (2011–2015)

Discography

Albums

Singles

References

External links
 
 (Victor Entertainment) 

2011 establishments in Japan
All-female bands
Japanese rock music groups
Japanese heavy metal musical groups
Musical groups established in 2011
Musical quartets
Musical groups disestablished in 2018
2018 disestablishments in Japan